Sean MacAuley (born 27 February 1980 in Edinburgh), is a Scottish football midfielder who plays for Preston Athletic.

MacAuley joined Clyde in the summer of 2000, signing from Edinburgh amateur club Links United. He never established himself in the first team, making only 5 appearances, before joining East Stirlingshire in March 2001. He spent over 4 years with the Shire, before signing for non-league Preston Athletic.

External links

Living people
1980 births
Scottish footballers
Clyde F.C. players
East Stirlingshire F.C. players
Scottish Football League players
Preston Athletic F.C. players
Footballers from Edinburgh
Association football midfielders